Bridgewater Center may refer to:

Bridgewater Center Historic District, a historic district in Connecticut
Bridgewater Center, Ohio, an unincorporated community